Bandar Kola-ye Aghowzin (also Romanized as Bandār Kolā-ye Āghowzīn; also known as Bandar Kolā and Bandār Kolā-ye Āghowz Bon) is a village in Feyziyeh Rural District, in the Central District of Babol County, Mazandaran Province, Iran. At the 2006 census, its population was 337, in 85 families.

References 

Populated places in Babol County